The principle of maximum caliber (MaxCal) or maximum path entropy principle, suggested by E. T. Jaynes, can be considered as a generalization of the principle of maximum entropy. It postulates that the most unbiased probability distribution of paths is the one that maximizes their Shannon entropy. This entropy of paths is sometimes called the "caliber" of the system, and is given by the path integral

History 

The principle of maximum caliber was proposed by Edwin T. Jaynes in 1980, in an article titled 
The Minimum Entropy Production Principle over the context of to find a principle for to derive the non-equilibrium statistical mechanics.

Mathematical formulation 

The principle of maximum caliber can be considered as a generalization of the principle of maximum entropy defined over the paths space, the caliber  is of the form

 

where for n-constraints

 

it is shown that the probability functional is

 

In the same way, for n dynamical constraints defined in the interval  of the form

 

it is shown that the probability functional is

Maximum caliber and statistical mechanics

Following Jaynes' hypothesis, there exist publications in which the principle of maximum caliber appears to emerge as a result of the construction of a framework which describes a statistical representation of systems with many degrees of freedom.

Notes

Entropy and information
Bayesian statistics
maximum caliber
Probability assessment
maximum caliber